Fakhr al-Din is an Arabic male given name and (in modern usage) a surname, meaning pride of the religion.  Alternative transliterations include Fakhruddin , Fakhreddin, Fakhreddine,  Fakhraddin, Fakhruddin, Fachreddin, Fexredîn etc.

People
Notable people with the given name, ordered by age of individual:

Given name
Fakhruddin As'ad Gurgani, 11th-century Persian poet
Fakhr al-Din Shaheed, leader of the early Isma'ili movement in India
Baba Fakruddin, 12th century Iranian-Indian Sufi saint
Fakhr ad-Din ar-Razi (1149–1209), Persian Sunni Muslim theologian and philosopher
Fakhr-al-Din Iraqi (1213–1289), Persian philosopher and mystic
Fexredîn, a holy figure in  Yezidism
Fakhruddin Mubarak Shah (fl. 1340), King of Bengal
 Abdallah Fakhr al-Din (died 1407), leader of the Tayyibi Isma'ili community
Fakhr al-Din I (d. 1506), Druze leader in Mount Lebanon
Fakhr ad-Din al-Burdwani (d. 1785), Bengali Islamic scholar
Fakhr al-Din II (1572–1635), Druze leader in Mount Lebanon
Fakhruddin Ali Ahmed (1905–1977), President of India
Fakhreddin Shadman (1907–1967), Iranian scholar and politician
Fakhruddin T. Khorakiwala (c. 1918–2011), Indian businessman
Fakhruddin G. Ebrahim (born 1928), Pakistani lawyer
Fakhraddin Mousavi Naneh Karani (born 1930), Iranian Cleric & Politician
Fahrettin Cüreklibatır, known as Cüneyt Arkın (born 1937), Turkish actor and director
Fakhruddin Ahmed (born 1940), Bangladeshi economist
Fakhraddin Manafov (born 1955), Azerbaijani and Soviet actor
Fahrudin Durak (born 1966), Turkish footballer
Fakhredin Fouad (born 1967), Jordanian athlete in the high jump
Fakhraddin Atayev (born 1972), Azerbaijani conductor
Fakhreddine Galbi (born 1984), Tunisian footballer

Surname
Baba Fakruddin, 12th century Iranian-Indian Sufi saint
Abdul Rozak Fachruddin (1915–1995), Indonesian Islamic leader
Mariam Fakhr Eddine (1933–2014), Egyptian actress
Youssef Fakhr Eddine (1935–2002), Egyptian actor
Ali Fakhreddine (born 1983), Lebanese basketball player

See also

Fakhr / Fakhri / Fakhry / Fahri, disambiguation
Fakhreddine Mosque, in Deir el Qamar, Chouf, Lebanon
Fakhreddine Palace, in Deir el Qamar, Chouf, Lebanon
Fakr Ad-Din Mosque, in Mogadishu, Somalia

References

Arabic masculine given names